Tabas County is in South Khorasan province, Iran. The capital of the county is the city of Tabas. It was a part of Ferdows County in Khorasan province until July 1960. Tabas County became a part of Yazd province in 2001.

At the 2006 census, the county's population was 63,047 in 16,845 households. The following census in 2011 counted 69,658 people in 19,745 households. Tabas County became a part of South Khorasan province in 2013. At the 2016 census the county's population was 72,617, in 22,142 households, by which time the county had been separated from Yazd province to join South Khorasan province.

Administrative divisions

The population history of Tabas County's administrative divisions over three consecutive censuses is shown in the following table. The latest census shows three districts, eight rural districts, and three cities.

References

 

Counties of South Khorasan Province